is a Japanese, Tokyo-based chemical company and the world's fourth largest silicon manufacturer.

The company was founded as Nihon Soda Kogyo Co., Ltd., a producer of soda ash in 1918 by Katsujiro Iwai. It changed name in 1936 to Tokuyama Soda Co., Ltd. and in 1994 to its present name. It is listed on the Tokyo Stock Exchange and is a component of the Nikkei 225 stock index.

The company operates across Japan, Taiwan, China, South Korea, Singapore, Malaysia, Australia, United States, and Germany.

Business segments and products

Chemicals business
 Soda ash and calcium chloride
 Chlor-alkali and vinyl chloride products: caustic soda (liquid, flake), propylene oxide, vinyl chloride monomer
 New organic chemicals: isopropyl alcohol

Cement business
 Portland cement: ordinary, early-strength, medium-heat
 Recycling services
 Fresco Giclee

Specialty products business
 Electronic materials: polycrystalline silicon
 Fumed silica
 SHAPAL products: aluminum nitride (powder, granules)
 IC chemicals and the cleaning system: high purity chemicals for electronics manufacturing, positive-type photoresist

Life and amenity business
 Fine Chemicals: photochromic dye materials, hard coating solutions for plastic lenses, pharmaceutical bulk ingredients, amino radical protectants
 Microporous film: polyethylene porous film
 Dental materials

Source

Gallery

References

External links 
 Official global website 

Chemical companies based in Tokyo
Cement companies of Japan
Manufacturing companies based in Tokyo
Companies listed on the Tokyo Stock Exchange
Chemical companies established in 1918
Japanese brands
Midori-kai
Japanese companies established in 1918